Ben Murphy is an American football coach. Most recently, he served as the defensive coordinator at Wisconsin Lutheran College.  In 2013, he served as head coach at Wisconsin Lutheran College while Dennis Miller had a one-year retirement.

A four-year player for Wisconsin Lutheran, Murphy spent one year as a defensive line coach at Northern State University in Aberdeen, South Dakota.

Head coaching record

References

Year of birth missing (living people)
Living people
American football defensive linemen
Northern State Wolves football coaches
Wisconsin Lutheran Warriors football coaches
Wisconsin Lutheran Warriors football players